Thamnodynastes is a genus of snakes of the family Colubridae.

Geographic range
All species in the genus Thamnodynastes are endemic to South America.

Species
The following 4 species are recognized as being valid.
 Thamnodynastes longicauda Franco, Ferreira, Marques & Sazima, 2003
 Thamnodynastes pallidus (Linnaeus, 1758)
 Thamnodynastes sertanejo Bailey, Thomas, & Da Silva, 2005
 Thamnodynastes silvai Trevine, Caicedo-Portilla, Hoogmoed, Thomas, Franco, Montingelli, Osorno-Munoz, & Zaher, 2021

Nota bene: A binomial authority in parentheses indicates that the species was originally described in a genus other than Thamnodynastes.

References

Further reading
Freiberg M (1982). Snakes of South America. Hong Kong: T.F.H. Publications. 189 pp. . (Genus Thamnodynastes, p. 112).
Wagler J (1830). Natürliches System der AMPHIBIEN, mit vorangehender Classification der SÄUGTHIERE und VÖGEL. Ein Beitrag zur vergleichenden Zoologie. Munich, Stuttgart and Tübingen: J.G. Cotta. vi + 354 pp. + one plate. (Thamnodynastes, new genus, p. 182). (in German and Latin).

Thamnodynastes
Snake genera
Taxa named by Johann Georg Wagler